The Mark 42 5"/54 caliber gun (127mm) is a naval gun (naval artillery) mount used by the United States Navy and other countries. It consisted of the Mark 18 gun and Mark 42 gun mount. United States naval gun terminology indicates the gun fires a projectile  in diameter, and the barrel is 54 calibers long (barrel length is 5" × 54 = 270" or 6.9 meters.) In the 1950s a gun with more range and a faster rate of fire than the 5"/38 caliber gun used in World War II was needed, therefore, the gun was created concurrently with the 3"/70 Mark 26 gun for different usages. The 5"/54 Mk 42 is an automatic, dual-purpose (air / surface target) gun mount. It is usually controlled remotely from the Mk 68 Gun Fire Control System, or locally from the mount at the One Man Control (OMC) station.

The self-loading gun mount weighs about  including two drums under the mount holding 40 rounds of semi-fixed case type ammunition. Maximum rate of fire is 40 rounds per minute. Magazine capacity is 599 rounds per mount. The Mark 42 mount originally was equipped for two on-mount gunners, one surface and one antiaircraft, but the antiaircraft gunner position was scrapped later on when the increasing speed of naval aircraft made manual aiming of anti aircraft weapons impractical. The Mark 45 lightweight gun mount began replacing the Mk 42 mount in 1971 for easier maintenance and improved reliability in new naval construction for the United States Navy.

Users

United States Navy
 First used on 
  (later removed during upgrade)
  and 
 
 
 
 
 

Royal Australian Navy
  (modified Charles F. Adams class)

Egyptian Navy
 Damiyat-class frigate (ex-USN Knox-class frigates)

German Navy
  (modified Charles F. Adams class)

Hellenic Navy
 Ipiros-class frigate (ex-USN Knox-class frigates)
 Kimon-class destroyer (ex-USN Charles F. Adams-class destroyer)

Japan Maritime Self-Defense Force
 
 
 
 
 

Mexican Navy
 Ignacio Allende-class frigate (ex-USN Knox-class frigates)

Spanish Navy
  (modified Knox class)

Republic of China Navy
 Chih Yang-class frigate (modified ex-USN Knox class)

Royal Thai Navy
  (ex-USN Knox-class frigates)

Turkish Navy
 Muavenet-class frigate (ex-USN Knox-class frigates)

See also
 5"/38 caliber gun US predecessor
 5"/54 caliber Mark 16 gun US predecessor
 5"/54 caliber Mark 45 gun US successor
 QF 4.5 inch Mk I - V naval gun British equivalent

Notes

Bibliography

External links

 GlobalSecurity.org Mk 42
 NavWeaps.com Mk 42
 5"/54 MK 42 GUN - Seaman - Military manual for the Seaman rate  via tpub.com

Naval guns of the United States
Naval weapons of the Cold War
5 inch
127 mm artillery
Military equipment introduced in the 1950s